John Buckworth may refer to:

Sir John Buckworth, 1st Baronet (1662–1709), English merchant
Sir John Buckworth, 2nd Baronet (1704–1759), MP for Weobley
Sir John Buckworth, 4th Baronet (1726–1801), of the Buckworth baronets
Sir John Buckworth-Herne-Soame, 8th Baronet (1794–1888), of the Buckworth baronets

See also
Buckworth (surname)